The 2016–17 season was Shrewsbury Town's 131st year in existence and their second consecutive season in League One after finishing in 20th place the previous season.

After a poor start to the season, winning only two of the opening ten league matches, manager Micky Mellon and his assistant Mike Jackson left the club, and four subsequent successive defeats under the caretaker management of goalkeeping coach Danny Coyne saw Shrewsbury rooted to the bottom of the league table. Grimsby Town manager Paul Hurst was appointed alongside assistant Chris Doig on 24 October 2016, eventually steering the club to an 18th-placed finish, three league places and two points clear of local rivals Port Vale who occupied the final relegation place.

The club also participated in the FA Cup, League Cup and the Football League Trophy. A team consisting of fringe and youth team players contested the Shropshire Senior Cup final, losing to AFC Telford United.

The season covers the period from 1 July 2016 to 30 June 2017.

Transfers

Transfers in

Transfers out

Loans in

Loans out

New contracts & contract extensions

Competitions

Pre-season friendlies

League One

League table

Matches

FA Cup

Shrewsbury Town entered the FA Cup at the first round stage. The draw was made on 17 October 2016, Shrewsbury will host Barnet at New Meadow. The draw for the second round will be made on 7 November.

League Cup
Shrewsbury Town entered the League Cup at the first round stage. The draw was made on 22 June 2016, Huddersfield Town visited New Meadow. The draw for the second round was made on 10 August, Shrewsbury will travel to Sunderland.

EFL Trophy

See main article: 2016–17 EFL Trophy

Group stage
Fixtures for the group stages were released on 27 July 2016. Shrewsbury were allocated a place in Northern Group G.

Shropshire Senior Cup
Shrewsbury Town received a bye to the final. They will host AFC Telford United at New Meadow. The fixture was originally scheduled for 1 November 2016, but was postponed due to Shrewsbury Town's participation in the FA Youth Cup. The tie was later rescheduled for 4 April 2017, but then moved forward to the 14 March, to prevent a clash with Shrewsbury's rearranged league match with Millwall.

Player statistics

Squad statistics

As of match played 30 April 2017.

|-
|colspan="14"|Players who left the club before the season ended:
|-

|}

Top scorers

As of match played 30 April 2017.

a.  Player left the club during the playing season.

Clean sheets
As of match played 30 April 2017.

Disciplinary record
As of match played 30 April 2017.

Note: Two yellow cards in one match is counted as one red card.

a. Jim O'Brien's red card against Sheffield United on 19 November 2016 was later rescinded on appeal.
b. Aristote Nsiala's red card again Swindon Town on 8 January 2017 was later rescinded on appeal.
c.  Player left the club during the playing season.

References

Shrewsbury Town
Shrewsbury Town F.C. seasons